Radical Islamism may refer to:

 Islamic extremism
 Islamic fundamentalism
 Islamic terrorism
 Islamism
 Jihadism
 Wahhabism